Pamela Georgina Seaborne (née Elliott; 16 August 1935 – 26 April 2021) was a British hurdler. She competed in the women's 80 metres hurdles at the 1952 Summer Olympics. She was the bronze medallist at the 1954 European Athletics Championships.

She also represented England in the 80 metres hurdles at the 1954 British Empire and Commonwealth Games in Vancouver, Canada.

At national level, she was the under-17 winner of the 80-yard hurdles at the 1951 WAAA Intermediate and Junior Championships before going on to win the senior 80 metres hurdles title at the WAAA Championships in 1956. She later married decathlete Geoff Elliott and immigrated to Canada in 1963, where she died on 26 April 2021 at the age of 85.

International competitions

National titles
WAAA Championships
80 metres hurdles: 1956

See also
List of European Athletics Championships medalists (women)
List of British champions in sprint hurdles

References

External links
 

1935 births
2021 deaths
British female hurdlers
English female hurdlers
Olympic athletes of Great Britain
Athletes (track and field) at the 1952 Summer Olympics
Commonwealth Games competitors for England
Athletes (track and field) at the 1954 British Empire and Commonwealth Games
AAA Championships winners
Athletes from London